XHPCAR-FM is a radio station on 95.5 FM in Ciudad del Carmen, Campeche. It is owned by Grupo SIPSE and known as La Comadre.

History
XHPCAR was awarded in the IFT-4 radio auction of 2017. Grupo SIPSE paid 4.988 million pesos. The station signed on in April 2019.

In September 2022, Grupo SIPSE replaced Kiss FM format with a Regional Mexican format known as La Comadre.

References

External links

Radio stations in Campeche
Radio stations established in 2019
2019 establishments in Mexico